The Kip Homestead is located in Rutherford, Bergen County, New Jersey, United States. The homestead was built in 1770 and was added to the National Register of Historic Places on January 10, 1983.

See also 

 National Register of Historic Places listings in Bergen County, New Jersey

References

External links
 View of Kip Homestead via Google Street View

Houses completed in 1770
Houses on the National Register of Historic Places in New Jersey
Houses in Bergen County, New Jersey
National Register of Historic Places in Bergen County, New Jersey
Rutherford, New Jersey
New Jersey Register of Historic Places
1770 establishments in New Jersey